Wibrandis Rosenblatt (1504–1564) was the wife of three major religious reformers, who predeceased her: Johannes Oecolampadius (married, 1528–1531), Wolfgang Capito (married, 1532–1541), and Martin Bucer (married, 1542–1551).

Family life  
Rosenblatt was born in 1504 in Bad Säckingen and raised in Basel.

She first married a young scholar and humanist named Ludwig Keller (married, 1524-1526), with whom she had one daughter. Keller died in 1528, and she married Oecolampadius later that year.

She had three children with Oecolampadius, two of whom died in childhood. After Oecolampadius died in 1531, she married his friend Capito (who was also newly widowed) and moved to Strasbourg. She had five children with Capito, but he and several of their children died in the plague of 1541. Rosenblatt's friend Elisabeth Bucer also died in the same plague, but before she died asked her widowed friend to marry her own husband. Rosenblatt married Bucer in 1542, and had two children with him (they did not survive to adulthood). She joined him in his exile to England in 1549.

She was in all the mother of 11 children, and also cared for other children and relatives in her four husbands' households.

After Bucer died she returned to Basel, where she died of bubonic plague in 1564.

References 

 Sonja Domröse: Frauen der Reformationszeit. Gelehrt, mutig und glaubensfest. Vandenhoeck & Ruprecht, Göttingen 2010, .
 Irina Bossart: Wibrandis Rosenblatt (1504–1564) – „euer Diener im Herrn“ oder: Das Wort gewinnt Gestalt im Tun. In: Adelheid M. von Hauff (Hrsg.): Frauen gestalten Diakonie. Band 1: Von der biblischen Zeit bis zum Pietismus. Kohlhammer Verlag, Stuttgart 2007, S. 321–336.
 Susanna Burghartz: Wibrandis Rosenblatt – Die Frau der Reformatoren. In: Theologische Zeitschrift. Bd. 60, Nr. 4, 2004, S. 337–349, (Digitalisat (PDF; 105,63 KB)).
 Roland H. Bainton: Frauen der Reformation. Von Katharina von Bora bis Anna Zwingli. 10 Porträts (= Gütersloher Taschenbücher. 1442). 2. Auflage. Gütersloher Verlags-Haus, Gütersloh 1996, S. 84–102.
 Ernst Staehelin: Frau Wibrandis. A Woman in the Time of Reformation. Translated by E.L. Miller. Wipf & Stock, Eugene, OR., 2009.
 Ernst Staehelin: Frau Wibrandis. Eine Gestalt aus den Kämpfen der Reformationszeit. Gotthelf-Verlag, Bern u. a. 1934.

External links 
 
 
 Susanna Burghartz: Wibrandis Rosenblatt – Die Frau der Reformatoren. Zum Andenken an Katharina Preiswerk (1917-2003). ThZ 4/60 (2004), S. 337–349  
 Helen Liebendörfer: Die Frau im Hintergrund. Historischer Roman. F. Reinhardt, Basel 2013, .

1504 births
1564 deaths
People from Bad Säckingen
People from Basel-Stadt
People of the Protestant Reformation
16th-century deaths from plague (disease)
16th-century German women
German evangelicals
Swiss evangelicals